East West Bus Company was a privately owned bus operator in Melbourne, Australia. As a Melbourne bus company, it operated three bus routes under contract to the Government of Victoria.

History
East West Bus Company was formed in August 1980 as a joint venture between Dysons Group and Reservoir Bus Company operating route 560 Broadmeadows station to Greensborough. Route 560 ceased in April 2010 being replaced by SmartBus route 902.

In February 2014 the Dyson Group became the sole owner, and bus services ran in Dysons branding. As of March 2019, all routes are shown in the Public Transport Victoria website as being operated by Dysons.

Fleet
As of May 2013 East West Bus Service operated a fleet of 17 buses.

See also
Buses in Melbourne
List of Victorian Bus Companies
List of Melbourne bus routes

References

External links
Company website
Public Transport Victoria timetables
Showbus gallery

Bus companies of Victoria (Australia)
Bus transport in Melbourne
Transport companies established in 1980
Australian companies established in 1980